Ray Dream Studio was a low-end 3D modeling software application. Initially developed by Ray Dream, Inc. in 1989-1991 for the Macintosh, it was acquired and upgraded over the course of mergers with Fractal Design and MetaCreations. Ray Dream was less expensive than most other offerings, renowned for its ease of use, and boasted an impressive feature set including a sophisticated shader editor. Other software programs from the same developers, such as Fractal Design Painter 3D, were often introduced in basic form to the suite. A moderately limited version lacking animation capability was sold for $99 as Ray Dream Designer (later Ray Dream 3D), and quickly became a mass-market favorite.

The first three major revisions were very buggy. By the time of release of version 4, in late 1995, this had improved. In 1996, Ray Dream was acquired by Fractal Design, and in early 1997, Fractal Design merged with MetaTools to form MetaCreations. Versions 5.0 and 5.5 were released by MetaCreations. The software was then merged with its higher-end stepsister, Infini-D, to form Carrara, lending many user interface elements and gaining a better rendering engine. Today, Carrara is maintained by Daz 3D.

External Links/Sources
Carrara history

3D graphics software
1989 software